Joseph Bernstein (sometimes spelled I. N. Bernshtein; ; ; born 18 April 1945) is a Soviet-born Israeli mathematician working at Tel Aviv University. He works in algebraic geometry, representation theory, and number theory.

Biography 
Bernstein received his Ph.D. in 1972 under Israel Gelfand at Moscow State University. In 1981, he emigrated to the United States due to growing anti-semitism in the Soviet Union. 
Bernstein was a professor at Harvard during 1983-1993. 
He was a visiting scholar at the Institute for Advanced Study in 1985-86 and again in 1997-98. In 1993, he moved to Israel to take a professorship at Tel Aviv University (emeritus since 2014).

Awards and honors
Bernstein received a gold medal at the 1962 International Mathematical Olympiad. He was elected to the Israel Academy of Sciences and Humanities in 2002 and was elected to the United States National Academy of Sciences in 2004. In 2004, Bernstein was awarded the Israel Prize for mathematics. In 1998, he was an Invited Speaker of the International Congress of Mathematicians in Berlin. In 2012, he became a fellow of the American Mathematical Society.

Publications 
 Publication list
 Some pdf files of papers by Bernstein including    Algebraic theory of D-modules and his notes on Meromorphic continuation of Eisenstein series

See also 
 Bernstein–Sato polynomial
 Bernstein–Gelfand–Gelfand resolution

References

External links 
 Bernstein's home page
 

1945 births
Living people
20th-century Russian mathematicians
21st-century Russian mathematicians
Israeli mathematicians
Russian emigrants to Israel
Russian Jews
Israeli Jews
Jewish scientists
Algebraic geometers
Group theorists
Number theorists
Israel Prize in mathematics recipients
EMET Prize recipients in the Exact Sciences
Moscow State University alumni
Academic staff of Tel Aviv University
Fellows of the American Mathematical Society
Members of the Israel Academy of Sciences and Humanities
Members of the United States National Academy of Sciences
Soviet Jews
Institute for Advanced Study visiting scholars
International Mathematical Olympiad participants